Bennett High School is a secondary school located in Bennett, Colorado, United States.

Vocational programs at Bennett are offered in business, agriculture, and industrial arts. Also available, through the T. H. Pickens Technical Center in Aurora, is a full range of auto, electronics, drafting, cosmetology, and health related programs.

Bennett's teams compete in the 3A Frontier League.

See also
List of high schools in Colorado

References
"Patriot League changes move schools around" Greeley Tribune, March 14, 2006

External links
 

Public high schools in Colorado
Schools in Adams County, Colorado